These are the results for the boys' 56 kg event at the 2018 Summer Youth Olympics.

Results

References

 Results 

Weightlifting at the 2018 Summer Youth Olympics